Alliance Holdings Limited (AHL) is one of the largest Bangladeshi conglomerates. The industries under the conglomerate include inland container terminals, manufacturing of pre-fabricated steel buildings and power, lubricant blending, financial services and financial technology.

History

The company was incorporated in 1998 as a holding with various business interests in Bangladesh.

List of companies 

 Summit Alliance Port Limited
 Ispahani Summit Alliance Terminal Limited
 Oriental Oil Company Limited
 Alliance Oil Limited
 Lankan Alliance Finance Limited
 PEB Steel Alliance Limited
 Union Accessories Limited
 Fountain Garments Manufacturing Limited
 CASHe Alliance Limited

See also 
 List of companies of Bangladesh
 Summit Alliance Port Limited

References

External links 
 

Bangladeshi companies established in 2008
Conglomerate companies of Bangladesh
Companies listed on the Chittagong Stock Exchange